Blatnička is a municipality and village in Hodonín District in the South Moravian Region of the Czech Republic. It has about 400 inhabitants.

Twin towns – sister cities

Blatnička is twinned with:
 Falkenstein, Austria

References

Villages in Hodonín District
Moravian Slovakia